Charles, Charlie, or Chuck Perry may refer to:

Politics and law
Charles T. Perry (1812–1872), American politician; mayor of Hoboken, New Jersey
Charles Perry (Canadian politician) (1818–1876), Canadian businessman and Member of Parliament
Charles B. Perry (1855–1940), American politician, Speaker of the Wisconsin State Assembly
Charles D. Perry (1907–1964), American politician, New York state senator
Charles Perry (Texas politician) (born 1962), American politician, Texas state senator

Sports
Charlie Perry (footballer, born 1866) (1866–1927), English footballer
Charlie Perry (Australian rules footballer) (1888–1961), Australian rules footballer
Charles Perry (basketball) (1921–2001), American basketball player

Others
Charles Perry (traveller) (1698–1780), English traveller and medical writer
Charles Perry (bishop) (1807–1891), English Australian cleric, first Anglican bishop of Melbourne
Charles Elliott Perry (1871–1937), New Zealand Anglican clergyman
Charles Stuart Perry (1908–1982), New Zealand librarian
Charles Perry (author) (1924–1969), African American novelist, author of Portrait of a Young Man Drowning
Charles O. Perry (1929–2011), American artist, known for large scale public sculptures
Charles R. Perry (1934–2005), American construction industry leader and businessman in Florida
Chuck Perry (1937–1999), American academic, founding president of Florida International University
Charles Perry (food writer) (born 1941), American culinary historian, journalist, and translator of the Baghdad Cookery Book